James Eversfield was an English landowner who served as High Sheriff of Sussex.

Life 
Baptised on 1 November 1795 in the church of St Laurence in Catsfield, he was the younger son of William Markwick, who later changed his name to Eversfield, and his wife Mary. On 15 June 1815 in the church of St James, Picadilly he married Mary (1795–1872), daughter of Robert Hawgood Crew, Secretary to the Board of Ordnance, and his wife Mary Sophia, daughter of John Foreman. In 1818 his elder brother died, making him heir to the family's extensive landholdings, which included the manor and mansion of Catsfield as well as lands in Pevensey, Ninfield, Mountfield, Battle and Bexhill.

He served as High Sheriff of Sussex in 1822. Following the death of his mother in 1823, he sold the Catsfield property and moved to Denne Park outside Horsham. In 1825 he was one of the six proprietors of the Baybridge Canal at West Grinstead. Aged only 30 when he died, his will was proved on 13 Nov 1826.

He and Mary had three children:
Ann Isabella Mary Eversfield (1816–1904) married Charles Goodwin Bethune (1810–1864), who changed his name to Eversfield. They had eight children, including Henry Beauclerk Bethune.
Sophia Eversfield (1819–1901), who married Henry Paget, 3rd Marquess of Anglesey but had no children.
Charles Gilbert Eversfield (1822–1886) married Isabella Pigott (1820–1902) without having children, so they adopted his mother's stepdaughter Lucy Barbara Vaughan.

His widow Mary in 1827 married Henry Tredcroft, becoming the mother of Edward Tredcroft and, widowed a second time, in 1847 married the Reverend John James Vaughan.

References 

1795 births
1826 deaths
English landowners
High Sheriffs of Sussex
People from Catsfield
People from Horsham District
19th-century British businesspeople